Artem Olehovych Radchenko (born 2 January 1995) is a Ukrainian professional footballer who plays for Dainava.

Career
Radchenko is the product of the Metalist Kharkiv Youth School System. He made his debut for FC Metalist in the match against FC Illichivets Mariupol on 14 April 2012 in Ukrainian Premier League.

He moved to FC Hoverla Uzhhorod in early 2015. Hoverla Uzhhorod manager Vyacheslav Hroznyi declared on Ukrainian Channel 1 TV, that Artem had already signed a contract with Fenerbahçe and Uzhhorod already know that before the 6 months transfer. Radchenko denied that information.

In summer 2015, Radchenko joined team HNK Hajduk of Split, Croatia. At 6.30am on 7 August 2016, Radchenko was involved in a car accident, receiving only minor injuries and was released from hospital hours later. It was later discovered that Radchenko was over the legal blood alcohol limit and Hajduk announced that it would respond to the incident in the strongest possible manner. On 11 August 2016, it was announced that Artem Radchenko was released from Hajduk Split with immediate effect. Radchenko made just six appearances for 158 minutes in a Hajduk kit over 14 months at the club.

Radchenko signed for Belarusian Premier League side FC Dnepr Mogilev, making his debut in a 1–0 win over Gomel in April 2018, his first competitive match since 17 April 2016.

In January 2023 he moved to Dainava.

References

External links
 
 
 

1995 births
Living people
Ukrainian footballers
Footballers from Kharkiv
Association football midfielders
Ukraine youth international footballers
Competitors at the 2019 Summer Universiade
Ukrainian expatriate footballers
Expatriate footballers in Croatia
Expatriate footballers in Belarus
Expatriate footballers in Latvia
Expatriate footballers in Slovakia
Expatriate footballers in Lithuania
Ukrainian expatriate sportspeople in Croatia
Ukrainian expatriate sportspeople in Belarus
Ukrainian expatriate sportspeople in Latvia
Ukrainian expatriate sportspeople in Slovakia
Ukrainian expatriate sportspeople in Lithuania
Ukrainian Premier League players
Ukrainian First League players
Ukrainian Second League players
Croatian Football League players
FC Metalist Kharkiv players
FC Hoverla Uzhhorod players
HNK Hajduk Split players
FC Dnepr Mogilev players
MFC Mykolaiv players
FK Jelgava players
FC Peremoha Dnipro players
MŠK Fomat Martin players
FK Jonava players